T. Jack Thompson (16 February 1943 – 10 August 2017) was an Irish mission historian and scholar of African Christianity.

Biography 
After studying history at Queen's University Belfast, Thompson taught history and religious education at Regent House School in Newtownards. Thompson and his wife Phyllis first travelled to Malawi as missionaries of the Presbyterian Church of Ireland in 1970. He later developed an academic interest in the study of missions history and Christianity in Africa.

Thompson returned to the United Kingdom and completed his PhD studies at the University of Edinburgh in 1980, on the subject of Free Church of Scotland missionary Donald Fraser. He taught mission studies in the Selly Oak Colleges in Birmingham, before taking up a post in the 1993 in mission studies at New College, University of Edinburgh. It was in the latter institution that, from 2005 to 2008, he served as the director of the Centre for the Study of Christianity in the Non-Western World and edited the journal Studies in World Christianity. During his time in Scotland, he became a leading figure in relations between Scotland and Malawi, including through the Scotland Malawi Partnership. Ahead of his retirement from the University of Edinburgh, Thompson travelled back to Malawi and was bestowed the Ngoni name Jabulani Jere.  He was an elder in St Andrew's and St George's West Church, Edinburgh.

After retiring from Edinburgh, he served a year as Vice-Chancellor of the University of Livingstonia and was later an Honorary fellow at the University of Edinburgh.

Thompson died of cancer on 10 August 2017 in the Marie Curie Hospice, Edinburgh, and services were held on 31 August 2017.

Works

References

External links 
 Centre for the Study of World Christianity, New College, Edinburgh

1943 births
2017 deaths
Christian missions in Africa
Academics of the University of Edinburgh
Religion academics
World Christianity scholars
History of Christianity in Africa
Place of birth missing
Presbyterian missionaries in Malawi
20th-century Irish historians
Alumni of the University of Edinburgh School of Divinity